Kentucky Route 176 (KY 176) is a 12.742-mile (20.506 km) state highway in Muhlenberg County, Kentucky that runs from U.S. Route 62 in Greenville to Rockport-Paradise Road at Paradise via Drakesboro

Route description 
The highway starts in downtown Greenville, the Muhlenberg County seat, at the public square, which involves U.S. Route 62 (US 62) and KY 181. KY 176 then heads eastward to Drakesboro, where it crosses US 431/KY 70. KY 176's eastern terminus is at the Tennessee Valley Authority-operated Paradise coal-fired fossil plant where the old town of Paradise once stood. Rockport–Paradise Road is the last intersection the highway has.

History
Before the construction of the TVA-operated Paradise Fossil Plant, KY 176 went straight through the then-existing town of Paradise, and crossed the Green River into Ohio County via a ferry boat. KY 176 then turned to end with another junction with US 62 just east of Rockport, Kentucky. The section of road east of the river has long since been turned over to the maintenance of the Ohio County Road Department in 1964.

Major intersections

References

External links
Kentucky Route 176 at Kentucky Roads

0176
0176